Thomas Jack Henry (born July 29, 1997) is an American professional baseball pitcher for the Arizona Diamondbacks of Major League Baseball (MLB). He played college baseball for the Michigan Wolverines.

Early life
Henry attended Portage Northern High School in Portage, Michigan, where he was the 2016 Mr. Baseball and Gatorade Player of the Year.

College career
In 2017 and 2018, he played collegiate summer baseball for the Yarmouth-Dennis Red Sox of the Cape Cod Baseball League.

As a junior, Henry led the 2019 Michigan Wolverines baseball team to the 2019 College World Series. Despite having been hospitalized with the flu, he was the winning pitcher against No. 1 UCLA in the deciding game of the NCAA Super Regional on June 9.

On June 17, he pitched a three-hit, complete-game shutout with 10 strikeouts against Florida State in the College World Series. Michigan coach Erik Bakich said of Henry's performance: "He was the entire storyline. We needed a strong performance, and he gave us something magical."

On June 24, in the first game of the College World Series finals against Vanderbilt, Henry was the winning pitcher and tallied eight strikeouts.

Overall, Henry compiled a 3–0 record, struck out 31 batters, and allowed eight earned runs in  innings during the 2019 NCAA Tournament.

Professional career
Henry was selected by the Arizona Diamondbacks with the 74th overall pick in the 2019 Major League Baseball draft. Henry made three appearances in 2019 for the Hillsboro Hops after signing, going 0–0 with a 6.00 ERA over 3 innings.

On August 3, 2022, the Diamondbacks selected Henry's contract from Triple-A Reno.

References

External links

Michigan Wolverines bio

1997 births
Living people
People from Portage, Michigan
Baseball players from Michigan
Major League Baseball pitchers
Arizona Diamondbacks players
Michigan Wolverines baseball players
Yarmouth–Dennis Red Sox players
Hillsboro Hops players
Amarillo Sod Poodles players
Reno Aces players